Liomera is a genus of crabs in the family Xanthidae, containing the following species:

Liomera albolineata (Serène & Nguyen, 1960)
Liomera bella (Dana, 1852)
Liomera caelata (Odhner, 1925)
Liomera canaliculatus (Hombron & Jacquinot, 1846)
Liomera cinctimana (White, 1847)
Liomera crucifera (Serène & Nguyen, 1960)
Liomera edwardsi Kossmann, 1877
Liomera guttata De Man, 1888
Liomera hartmeyeri (Odhner, 1925)
Liomera laevis (A. Milne-Edwards, 1873)
Liomera laperousei Garth, 1985
Liomera lophopa (Alcock, 1898)
Liomera margaritata (A. Milne-Edwards, 1873)
Liomera medipacifica (Edmondson, 1951)
Liomera monticulosa (A. Milne-Edwards, 1873)
Liomera nigrimanus Davie, 1997
Liomera nigropunctata (Serène & Nguyen, 1960)
Liomera pallida (Borradaile, 1900)
Liomera rubra (A. Milne-Edwards, 1865)
Liomera rugata (H. Milne-Edwards, 1834)
Liomera rugipes (Heller, 1861)
Liomera sagamiensis (Sakai, 1939)
Liomera semigranosa De Man, 1888
Liomera serratipes (Odhner, 1925)
Liomera stimpsonii (A. Milne-Edwards, 1865)
Liomera striolata (Odhner, 1925)
Liomera supernodosa (Rathbun, 1906)
Liomera tristis (Dana, 1852)
Liomera venosa (H. Milne-Edwards, 1834)
Liomera virgata (Rathbun, 1906)
Liomera yaldwyni Takeda & Webber, 2006

References

Xanthoidea